Diongaga is a small town and principal settlement of the commune of Diafounou Diongaga in the Cercle of Yélimané in the Kayes Region of south-western Mali, located just south of the border with Mauritania.

References

Populated places in Kayes Region